Television network, play-by-play and color commentator(s) for the Fiesta Bowl. The Fiesta Bowl began in 1971, but was considered a “minor bowl” until the January 1, 1982 game between Penn State–USC. Since then, the Fiesta Bowl has been considered a major bowl.

Starting with the 2010–11 season, ESPN started airing the games, out bidding Fox for the rights to the games.

Television

Spanish

In 2013, ESPN Deportes will provide the first Spanish U.S. telecast of the Fiesta Bowl.

Radio

References

External links
Ratings/viewership for the Fiesta Bowl since '96
Fiesta Bowl Ratings Dating Back to 1986 (Viewership Since 2002)
How the Fiesta Bowl made its way to TV

Lists of college football bowl broadcasters
Broadcasters
Fiesta Bowl
Fiesta Bowl
Fiesta Bowl
Fiesta Bowl
Fiesta Bowl
Fiesta Bowl
Fiesta Bowl
Fiesta Bowl